This is a list of notable businesses, organizations or charities founded by Quakers. Many of these are no longer managed or influenced by Quakers. At the end of the article are businesses that have never had any connection to Quakers, although some people may believe that they did or still do.

See separate List of Friends schools

Businesses, organizations or charities with Quaker origins

A 
 Albright and Wilson, manufacturing chemists
 Allen & Hanburys, founded in London in 1715 by Quaker Silvanus Bevan and his brother Timothy; grew to be a leading pharmaceutical company with operations in Argentina, Australia, Britain, Canada, China, India and South Africa before being acquired by Glaxo Laboratories in 1958
 Alternatives to Violence Project, volunteer-run conflict transformation program started in a New York prison in 1975
 American Friends Service Committee, Quaker peace and social justice organization founded in 1917
 Amnesty International, human rights organization; Eric Baker was a founding partner

B 
Barclays Bank, finance
Bethlehem Steel, founded by Quaker entrepreneur Joseph Wharton
Bewley's, Irish hot beverage company founded by Samuel and Charles Bewley. The Bewleys were one of Ireland's most well known Quaker families.
Bradshaw's, Victorian and Edwardian publisher of the most widely used railway timetables in Britain, Europe and India, founded by Quaker George Bradshaw
Bryant and May, former match manufacturing company, founded by two Quakers, Francis May and William Bryant

C 
Cadbury plc, chocolate and drinks manufacturer, founded by Quaker John Cadbury, and expanded by Quaker sons Richard and George
Canadian Friends Historical Association, association of Quakers and historians who seek to preserve and communicate the ongoing history and faith of Friends (Quakers) in Canada and their contribution to the Canadian experience
Carr's, UK biscuit manufacturer
Clarks, shoe manufacturer
Coalbrookdale Company, iron manufacturer
Coast Medic, the UK charity providing Paramedic emergency care at sea.

D 
Duane Morris, now one of the 100 largest law firms in the US, and still committed to Quaker values

F 
Friends Provident, life insurance company, founded by Quakers Samuel Tuke and Joseph Rowntree
Furness Withy, British Marine Transport company, founded as Withy and Co., iron and steel shipbuilders, of West Hartlepool by Quaker brothers Henry Withy (1852-1922) and Edward Withy (1844-1927); grew to own in excess of a thousand ships

G 
 Gilkes Wilson and Company, British locomotive manufacturer
 Goodbody Stockbrokers, Irish Stockbrokers. Known for many years as "Goodbody & Webb", it was founded by two Quakers, Jonathan Goodbody and Richard Webb.
 Guilford College
 Greenpeace, campaigning environment organization; the four founding members include Irving Stowe and Dorothy Stowe of Vancouver Monthly Meeting.

H 
Huntley and Palmers biscuits, manufacturer in Reading, Berkshire
Huntsman, steel manufacturer

I 
The Inman Line, Victorian passenger shipping line on the North Atlantic, founded in 1850 by Irish Quaker industrialist John Grubb Richardson and Englishman William Inman
 The International Voluntary Service was founded in 1931 by the Swiss Quaker Pierre Ceresole

J 
Jacob's, Irish biscuit maker, best known for the cream cracker. Founded by William Beale Jacob and his brother Robert who were both Quakers.
J. S. Fry & Sons, chocolate manufacturer
John Fowler & Co., manufacturer of agricultural tools and machinery, founded by Quaker engineer and inventor John Fowler
J H Holmes & Co (showing the entry for John Henry Holmes), electrical engineer, inventor and manufacturers in Newcastle upon Tyne specialising in early motors, dynamos & switches, and were pioneers of electric lighting on trains and the Suez canal
Johns Hopkins University, renowned private university in Baltimore, Maryland, originally started as a graduate university by Quaker abolitionist Johns Hopkins, early board positions were partly filled by Friends
Joseph Rowntree Charitable Trust

L 
Lloyds Bank, finance

M 
 Merz & McLellan, British electrical engineering consultancy co-founded by Charles Hesterman Merz

N 
 Neptune Bank Power Station, designed by Merz & McLellan, first power station in the United Kingdom to generate three-phase electric power, and the first to supply electricity for industrial purposes rather than just lighting
 Newcastle Electric Supply Company, founded by John Theodore Merz, pioneered the use of high-voltage three-phase AC power distribution in the United Kingdom

O 
Oxfam, charity

P 
PQ Corporation, or Philadelphia Quartz Company, was originally founded by Philadelphia Quaker businessmen, Joseph Elkinton and Thomas Elkinton.
Priestman Brothers, Kingston upon Hull engineering company founded by Quaker William Dent Priestman and his brother Samuel Priestman, which built the earliest recorded railway locomotive powered by an internal combustion engine

Penington Friends House,founded in 1897 to provide shelter and meals to Quakers and friendly people coming to New York City. Long term and short stay guest rooms are still provided.

R 
Reckitt and Sons (now Reckitt), Kingston upon Hull household products manufacturer founded by Quaker Isaac Reckitt, and greatly expanded by his Quaker son Sir James Reckitt
Renovaré, interfaith group founded by Richard J. Foster
Rogers Communications, Canadian media conglomerate
Rogers Vacuum Tube Company, Canadian retailer and manufacturer of radio transmitters using alternating current vacuum tubes
Rowntree's (now Rowntree Mackintosh, owned by Nestlé), chocolate manufacturer, founded by Quaker Joseph Rowntree

S 
Sandy Spring Bank, founded in 1868 by Quaker farmers, now the largest bank in the state of Maryland, USA
Scott Bader Commonwealth, British manufacturer of advanced resins and composites, founded by Ernest Bader in 1951
Sony (formerly Tokyo Tsushin Kogyo, or Tokyo Telecommunication Engineering, Co.), TTK's founding board president was Tamon Maeda, a Japanese Quaker, prewar Japanese ambassador to ILO, and postwar Minister of Education
Stockton and Darlington Railway, established in 1825 by Quaker Edward Pease, operated the world's first permanent steam locomotive-hauled railway line
Strawbridge and Clothier (now part of Macy's), department store chain, USA (Pennsylvania, New Jersey, Delaware)

T 
Truth Legal Solicitors, founded in 2012 by Quaker solicitor Andrew Gray.

W 
Waterford Crystal, former producer of crystal glass, founded by Quakers in 1783, closed in 1851; the modern Waterford Wedgwood was not founded by Quakers, being the merger of a separate Waterford Crystal company founded in 1947 by non-Quaker Charles Bacik, and Wedgwood, founded by the Unitarian, Josiah Wedgwood.
Western Union, founded by Ezra Cornell.

Businesses with no Quaker connection 
Quaker Oats Company, food manufacturer
Quaker State, motor oil brand
Quaker Steak & Lube, casual dining restaurant chain based in Sharon, Pennsylvania

References

External links 
BBC article on Quakers successes in business
Video of a lecture given by James Walvin "Quakers, business and morality" on 25 April 2005 at Gresham College, Barnard’s Inn Hall

Further reading 
 The Biographical Dictionary of British Quakers in Commerce and Industry 1775-1920

Businesses
Quaker
 
Businesses